Augusta, Princess of Eulenburg and Hertefeld (12 May 1853 – 14 December 1943) was a princess and spouse of Philipp, Prince of Eulenburg, who achieved considerable influence as the closest friend of Wilhelm II. The princely family of Eulenburg struggled from the so-called Eulenburg affair when Philipp was accused of homosexuality.

Biography
Augusta Sandels was born on 12 May 1853 in Stockholm, Sweden. She was a daughter of Samuel August Sandels, and Hedvig Henrietta Emilie Augusta Tersmeden. Count Johan August Sandels was her grandfather.

Marriage and family
On 20 November 1875, at Stockholm, Augusta Sandels married Eulenburg (Stockholm, 12 May 1853 – Liebenberg, 14 December 1941) They had eight children:
 Philipp Graf zu Eulenburg (Wulkow, 16 November 1876 – Berlin, 28 June 1878)
 Astrid Gräfin zu Eulenburg (Berlin, 25 March 1879 – Paris, 23 March 1881)
 Alexandrine (Adine) Elise Klara Antonia Gräfin zu Eulenburg (Liebenberg, 1 July 1880 – Friedelhausen, 3 February 1957), married at Liebenberg, 15 June 1910 Eberhard Graf von Schwerin (Weilburg, 11 July 1882 – Giessen, 4 April 1954)
 Friedrich Wend 2. Fürst zu Eulenburg und Hertefeld Graf von Sandels (Starnberg, 19 September 1881 – Weeze, 1 August 1963), married at Liebenberg, 21 May 1904 Marie Freiin Mayr von Melnhof (Vienna, 8 April 1884 – Weeze, 3 February 1960)
 Augusta Alexandrine Gräfin zu Eulenburg (Starnberg, 1 September 1882 – Starnberg, 28 January 1974), married in London, 4 February 1907 (div 1931) Edmund Jaroljmek
 Sigwart Botho Philipp August Graf zu Eulenburg (Munich, 10 January 1884 – k.a. Jasło, Galicia, 2 June 1915), married in Leipzig, 21 September 1909 Helene Staegemann (Hannover, 18 April 1877 – Partenkirchen, 20 August 1923)
 Karl Kuno Eberhard Wend Graf zu Eulenburg (Starnberg, 16 June 1885 – Weeze, 4 December 1975), married firstly Saint Helier, Jersey, 27 May 1908 (div 1923) Sophie Moshammer (Munich, 9 April 1891 – Munich, 8 May 1944), married secondly in Munich, 5 November 1923 Geertruida Verwey (Utrecht, 6 May 1901 – Weeze, 28 October 1987)
 Viktoria Ada Astrid Agnes Gräfin zu Eulenburg (Starnberg, 13 July 1886 – Starnberg, 23 September 1967), married at Liebenberg, 12 May 1909 (div 1921) Prof. Otto Ludwig Haas-Heye (Heidelberg, 16 December 1879 – Mannheim, 9 June 1959)
Viktoria is the great-grandmother of Sophie, Hereditary Princess of Liechtenstein.

Ancestry

References

1853 births
1943 deaths
German princesses
Swedish countesses
Swedish emigrants to Germany